Yahukimo Football Club is an  Indonesian football club based in Yahukimo Regency, Highland Papua. Club played in Liga 3.

History
The club was previously named Persekaba Badung  based on Gelora Samudra Stadium, Badung, Bali. In 2007 Liga Indonesia First Division, Persekaba moved its headquarters to Yahukimo Regency. However, they used the Pendidikan Stadium, Wamena, Jayawijaya Regency to play their home game. Due to this reason, the club changed its name to Persekaba Yahukimo FC. Since the start of the 2010-11 season, the team used the name Yahukimo FC.

Name
 Persekaba Badung (1970; lists the major shareholder of the Government Badung Regency)
 Persekaba Yahukimo FC (2007-2010;  includes the name of the owner of a majority stake Persekaba Badung)
 Yahukimo FC (2011-present;  includes the name of the owner of a majority stake Yahukimo FC)

Supporters 
Yahukimonia is the name of the club supporters

References

External links
Persekaba Yahukimo FC at Liga-Indonesia.co.id

Football clubs in Indonesia
Football clubs in Highland Papua
1970 establishments in Indonesia